{{DISPLAYTITLE:Theta1 Orionis C}}

Theta1 Orionis C (θ1 Orionis C) is a member of the Trapezium open cluster that lies within the Orion Nebula. The star C is the most massive of the four bright stars at the heart of the cluster. It is an O class blue main sequence star with a B-type main sequence companion.  Its high luminosity and large distance (about 1,500 light years) give it an apparent visible magnitude of 5.1.

Theta1 Orionis consists of multiple components, primarily the four stars of the Trapezium cluster, all within one arc-minute of each other.  Theta2 Orionis is a more distant grouping of three main stars plus several fainter companions, 1-2 arc-minutes from Theta1.

Theta1 C is itself a binary of two massive stars, C1 and C2, plus a very close fainter companion apparently escaping the system.

Theta1 Orionis C1 is responsible for generating most of the ultraviolet light that is slowly ionizing (and perhaps photoevaporating) the Orion Nebula. This UV light is also the primary cause of the glow that illuminates the Orion Nebula. The star emits a powerful stellar wind that is a hundred thousand times stronger than the Sun's, and the outpouring gas moves at 1,000 km/s.

References

Orionis, Theta1, C
Orionis, 41, C
Binary stars
O-type main-sequence stars
Orion (constellation)
B-type main-sequence stars
037022
1895
Durchmusterung objects
026221